Keep On Moving is the third album by trio ESG.

Composition
Musically, Keep On Moving pulls in "bare-bones" electro-funk, as well as a "spare, quirky" R&B style. Tiny Mix Tapes saw its styles as dance-punk with some soul music added "for good measure".

Personnel
Sourced from AllMusic.

ESG
 Renee Scroggins - vocals, hand percussion
 Marie Scroggins - background vocals, hand percussion
 Valerie Scroggins - background vocals, drums, percussion, timbales

Technical
 Renee Scroggins - producer
 Leroy Glover - engineer

References

2006 albums
Electro albums by American artists
Soul Jazz Records albums
ESG (band) albums